Carrie Kei Heim (born December 7, 1973) is an American lawyer, writer, and former actress. She is best known for her roles as Cornelia in Santa Claus: The Movie (1985) and Nikki Ferris in The Parent Trap II (1986). After completing The Parent Trap ll, Heim retired from acting.

Biography
Heim is the daughter of Janie and Michael Heim of Manhattan.

Heim is a 1991 graduate of Hunter College High School, a 1994 graduate of Vassar College with a B.A. in French, and a 1996 graduate of Hunter College with an additional B.A. in English and Theater.  In 2001, Heim received a J.D. from the University of Pennsylvania law school and was a lawyer until 2008 when she lost her job. Carrie then went on to pursue a career in writing.

Heim has worked as a clerk for Jeffrey R. Howard of the United States Court of Appeals for the First Circuit and as a litigation associate for the law firms Cravath, Swaine & Moore and Mintz Levin.

Heim is now a novelist, and is currently represented by Jessica Faust at BookEnds Literary Agency.

On May 21, 2005, Heim married Peter K. Binas, son of Marina and George Binas of Whitestone at Annunciation Greek Orthodox Church (Manhattan), and currently has one child, a daughter, Katie, born April 12, 2007.

Filmography

References

External links

1973 births
Living people
20th-century American actresses
American child actresses
American women lawyers
American women writers
Hunter College alumni
Hunter College High School alumni
Massachusetts lawyers
People from Tokyo
University of Pennsylvania Law School alumni
Vassar College alumni
Writers from Massachusetts
Mintz Levin associates
Cravath, Swaine & Moore associates
21st-century American women